The 1997 U.S. F2000 National Championship was won by Zak Morioka.

Race calendar and results

Drivers' Championship

References

US F2000